KCTB-LP (94.1 FM) was a radio station licensed to serve Lonepine, Montana.  The station is owned and operated by Confederated Salish & Kootenai Tribes Disaster and Emergency Services.  KCTB-LP aired a classic country music format and provided emergency information coverage to its service area. Its license was cancelled on 1 July 2009.

An earlier KCTB-FM in Cut Bank, Montana on 102.7 FM had its license cancelled in 1993.

External links
 

CTB-LP
Classic country radio stations in the United States
CTB-LP
Native American radio
Defunct radio stations in the United States
Radio stations established in 2005
Radio stations disestablished in 2009
2005 establishments in Montana
2009 disestablishments in Montana
CTB-LP